The Marganitha ("Pearl") is a book summarising the doctrine of the Church of the East written by Mar Odisho, Metropolitan of N’siwin and Armenia, in 1298. The website of the Assyrian Church calls the Marganitha the "official manual of the faith of the Church of the East". The explanation of the author for naming the book as Margānītā (Pearl) is as follows: “I […] wrote this book, small in size and brief, but extensive in its subject matter. Hence, I have called it “The Pearl”, the truth of Christianity; and herein I have briefly treated of the origin, roots, plants and branches of the teaching of the Church” .

Structure
The book is divided in four parts:

On God
Theory Concerning God
That God is One and Not Many
That God is Eternal
That God is Incomprehensible
On the Trinity
On the Creation
On the Creation of the Universe
On First Man's Sin
On the Divine Laws and Ordinances, and On the Prophets
Prophecies Concerning Christ
On the Christian Dispensation
On the Advent of Christ, and His Union
On the Dispensation of Christ
On the Truth of Christianity
On the Different Sects
Refutation of the Foregoing Creeds
On the Title "Begetter of God"
On Four Qnume (Hypostasis)
On the Church
On the Church Sacraments
On the Number of the Church Sacraments
On the Priesthood
On Baptism
On the Oil of Unction
On the Oblation
On the Holy Leaven
On the Remission of Sins and Repentance
On Matrimony and on Virginity

The first part is theological, explaining God's necessary existence and most basic features, as revealed in the Old Testament. Following this is the Assyrian cosmology, which sets the stage for the coming of the Messiah. The next part is Christological, attempting to explain the Assyrian understanding of Jesus' personhood and divinity; this is the most crucial part in terms of explaining Assyrian doctrine to other Christian groups, as the Assyrians had been incorrectly labeled Nestorians for centuries. The thrust of this section is largely ecumenical, in an attempt to reconcile the linguistic and cultural forces that kept the Assyrians from the larger Christian community. The final division concerns the practice and significance of Christian sacraments. An appendix of the Assyrian patriarchs often follows the text of the book.

References

External links
, translated by George Percy Badger

Assyrian Church of the East
Texts in Syriac
1298
Christian theology books
13th-century books
13th-century Christian texts
Nestorian texts